Sunday Creek is a stream in the U.S. state of Washington. It is a tributary of the Green River.

Sunday Creek was first reached by railroad workers on Sunday, hence the name.

See also
List of rivers of Washington

References

Rivers of King County, Washington
Rivers of Washington (state)